The Focke-Wulf Fw 260 Flamingo and Focke-Wulf Fw 300 were a pair of related VTOL airliner projects, designed by Focke-Wulf during the early 1960s. Neither aircraft was built.

Fw 260
The Fw 260 design was displayed at the Luftfahrtschau Hanover trade show in 1962. The aircraft's design included a high-mounted, slightly-swept wing, carrying two two-engined pods for jet engines providing primary thrust, intended to be in the  class each; these were fitted with vectored thrust to assist in vertical takeoff, primary thrust for which was provided by two underwing pods each carrying six Bristol Siddeley BS.59 liftjets, each producing  thrust. Up to 85 passengers could be carried; this was later revised to 96.

Fw 300
At the Paris Air Show in 1963, the Fw 260 design was joined by a model of the Fw 300, a short-haul variant of the Fw 260.

Specifications (Fw 260)

See also

References

External links
 Fw 260 and Fw 300 at Secretprojects

Fw 260
Abandoned civil aircraft projects
Lift jet
Quadjets
Aircraft with auxiliary jet engines
High-wing aircraft
T-tail aircraft